Besma is a genus of moths in the family Geometridae.

Species
 Besma endropiaria (Grote & Robinson, 1867) – straw besma
 Besma quercivoraria (Guenée, 1857) – oak besma
 Besma rubritincta (Cassino & Swett, 1925)
 Besma sesquilinearia (Grote, 1883)

References
 Besma at Markku Savela's Lepidoptera and Some Other Life Forms
 Natural History Museum Lepidoptera genus database

Ourapterygini